The 2005 South Asian Football Federation Cup was the sixth edition of South Asian Football Federation Cup. It was the second time the competition was held in Pakistan. The tournament was played in two cities, Islamabad and Karachi with People's Football Stadium in Karachi hosting group-stages and Jinnah Sports Stadium in Islamabad hosting knock-out rounds and the finals. The tournament started on 7 December and ended on 17 December.

India won their fourth title after defeating Bangladesh 2–0 in the finals. Both sides contested the finals in the 1999 edition with India coming out victorious with the same result and Bhaichung Bhutia scored in that finals as well.

Ahmed Thariq, Ali Ashfaq and Ibrahim Fazeel of Maldives were the top-scorers of the tournament, all scoring three goals each.

Participating teams

Squads

Venue
The tournament was held at the Jinnah Sports Stadium in Islamabad.

Group stage

Group A

Group B

Knockout phase

Bracket

Semi-finals

Final

Champion

Statistics

Goalscorers

3 goals
  Ali Ashfaq
  Ahmed Thariq
  Ibrahim Fazeel
2 goals

  Ariful Kabir Farhad
  Jahid Hasan Ameli
  Rokonuzzaman Kanchan
  Bhaichung Bhutia
  Mehtab Hossain
  Umar Ali
  Basanta Thapa

1 goal

  Sayed Maqsood
  Hafizullah Qadami
  Abdul Maroof Gullestani
  Mohammed Sujan
  Bikash Pradhan
  Abdul Hakim
  Climax Lawrence
  Mahesh Gawli
  Mehrajuddin Wadoo
  N.S. Manju
  Bijaya Gurung
  Surendra Tamang
  Imran Hussain
  Muhammad Essa
  G.P.C. Karunarathne

Other Statistics
Most goals scored by: Maldives (11 goals)
Fewest goals scored by: Bhutan and Sri Lanka (1 goal)
Most goals conceded by: Afghanistan (11 goals)
Fewest goals conceded by: India and Maldives (2 goals)
Fastest goal by: Mehtab Hossain for India against Nepal

References

External links
 2005 SAFF Championship RSSSF

2005 in Asian football
2005
2005
2005–06 in Pakistani football
2005–06 in Sri Lankan football
2005–06 in Indian football
2005 in Maldivian football
2005 in Bhutanese football
2005 in Afghan football
2005 in Nepalese sport